William Thomas N Reeve (1913–2002) was a male rower (coxswain) who competed for England.

Rowing career
Reeve represented England and won a gold medal in the eights at the 1938 British Empire Games in Sydney, New South Wales, Australia.

Personal life
He was an works civil engineer by trade and lived in Westbourne Terrace, London during 1938 before moving to Lancashire.

References

1913 births
2002 deaths
English male rowers
Boxers at the 1938 British Empire Games
Commonwealth Games medallists in rowing
Commonwealth Games gold medallists for England
Medallists at the 1938 British Empire Games